Alex Patricio Calatrava (born 14 June 1973) is a former tour tennis player from Spain, who turned professional in 1993. The right-hander won one singles title (2000, San Marino). He reached his highest ATP singles ranking of World No. 44 in February 2001.

Tennis career
Calatrava defeated up and coming British star Alex Bogdanovic in five sets at 2004 US Open. 

In July 2005 Calatrava was beaten by 18-year old Novak Djokovic. The Serb dispatched Calatrava in straight sets at the Umag tournament in Croatia.

Personal
Calatrava was born in Germany while his parents lived there, returning to Spain live in 1980. His Spanish father, José, met his French mother, Gabrielle, while working Germany. Calatrava's uncle is the renowned architect Santiago Calatrava. 

Calatrava lived in California from 1989 to 1991 and attended a high school for one year in Palm Springs. He also lived a year in Indian Wells under the guidance of Spanish coach José Higueras.  He was the number one ranked junior player in California in 1991.

ATP career finals

Singles: 3 (1 title, 2 runner-ups)

Doubles: 1 (1 runner-up)

ATP Challenger and ITF Futures finals

Singles: 9 (4–5)

Doubles: 7 (2–5)

Performance timeline

Singles

References

External links
 
 

1973 births
Living people
Tennis players from Cologne
Spanish expatriate sportspeople in the United States
Spanish male tennis players
Spanish people of French descent